Third man is a cricket fielding position.

Third Man may also refer to:

Art, entertainment, and media
 The Third Man, a 1949 film noir
 The Third Man: Life at the Heart of New Labour, a book by Peter Mandelson
 Third Man Records, an independent record label owned by musician Jack White
 The Third Man (album), a 2007 album by Enrico Rava and Stefano Bollani
 "The Third Man Theme", zither instrumental written by Anton Karas
 The Third Man (TV series), a British-American television series broadcast from 1959 to 1965
 "The Third Man" (Supernatural), an episode of the television series Supernatural

Other uses
 Third Man, a member of the Cambridge Five spy ring ultimately revealed as Kim Philby (1912–1988)
 Third man argument, a philosophical argument attributed to Plato
 Third man factor, situations where an unseen presence provides comfort or support during traumatic experiences
 Third man in, a rule pertaining to fighting in ice hockey providing for the ejection of a player who joins a fight already in progress

See also 
 Third Man on the Mountain (1950), a 1959 film directed by Ken Annakin
 Third Man Out (film), a 2005 film directed by Ron Oliver
 Third wheel (disambiguation)
 "Third Wheel", an episode of the television series How I Met Your Mother